Leuenberger is a surname. Notable people with the surname include:

Matthew Leuenberger (born 1988), Australian rules football player
Moritz Leuenberger (born 1946), Swiss politician
Myriam Leuenberger (born 1987), Swiss figure skater
Niklaus Leuenberger (c1615-1653), Swiss rebel
Sven Leuenberger (born 1969), Swiss ice hockey player
Werner Otto Leuenberger (born 1932), Swiss artist